Zenkovići is a village in the municipalities of Oštra Luka, Republika Srpska and Sanski Most, Federation of Bosnia and Herzegovina, Bosnia and Herzegovina.

Demographics 
According to the 2013 census, its population was 100, all living in the Sanski Most part, thus none in the Republika Srpska part.

References

Populated places in Sanski Most
Populated places in Oštra Luka